Pristimantis pirrensis is a species of frog in the family Strabomantidae.

It is endemic to Panama.
Its natural habitat is tropical moist montane forests.

References

pirrensis
Endemic fauna of Panama
Amphibians of Panama
Frogs of South America
Amphibians described in 2004
Taxonomy articles created by Polbot